Patty Fendick and Mary Joe Fernández won their first career Grand Slam title, defeating Gigi Fernández and Jana Novotná 7–6(7–4), 6–1 in the final.

Seeds

Draw

Finals

Top half

Section 1

Section 2

Bottom half

Section 3

Section 4

References
 Main Draw

External links
 1991 Australian Open – Women's draws and results at the International Tennis Federation

Women's Doubles
Australian Open (tennis) by year – Women's doubles
1991 in Australian women's sport